Charles Jenks Simons (29 March 1843 — 18 June 1914) was a first lieutenant in the United States Army who was awarded the Medal of Honor for gallantry during the American Civil War. He was awarded the medal on 27 July 1896 for actions performed at the Battle of Petersburg in Virginia on 30 July 1864.

Personal life 
Simons was born on 29 March 1843 in Bombay (modern-day Mumbai), India. He married Ellen F. Adams in 1868 and fathered one son, Francis Pitcher Simons. He died in Chicago, Illinois, on 18 June 1914 and was cremated at Oak Woods Cemetery in Chicago. His ashes were returned to his family.

Military service 
Simons enlisted in the Army as a sergeant in Exeter, New Hampshire, on 12 June 1862. On 3 July 1862 he was assigned to Company A of the 9th New Hampshire Infantry. He was wounded on 30 July 1864.

Simons' Medal of Honor citation reads: 

On 1 November 1864, Simons was transferred to Company K of the 9th and promoted to second lieutenant. He was promoted to first lieutenant on 1 February 1865 and was transferred back to Company A. He was mustered out of the Army on 10 June 1865 at Alexandria, Virginia.

References 

1843 births
1914 deaths
American Civil War recipients of the Medal of Honor
United States Army Medal of Honor recipients
Foreign-born Medal of Honor recipients
Military personnel from Mumbai
Union Army non-commissioned officers
Union Army officers